Arnór Sveinn Aðalsteinsson (born 26 January 1986) is an Icelandic football player, currently playing for Icelandic football club Breiðablik. He won the Icelandic championship in 2010 and the Icelandic Cup in 2009 with Breiðablik.

Club career
Arnór made his debut for Breiðablik in 2004 in 1. deild karla. He was a key member of Breiðablik's 2010 Úrvalsdeild karla championship team.

He played for Hønefoss from 2011 to 2013 before returning to Breiðablik in January 2014. In November 2016, Arnór Sveinn joined Úrvalsdeild rivals KR.

In November 2022, Arnór Sveinn signed with Breiðablik.

Club career statistics

Statistics accurate as of match played 4 August 2013

International career
Arnór made his international debut in a friendly match away against Iran in November 2009, coming on as a sub at half time.

Honours
Breiðablik
 Icelandic Premier League (1): 2010
 Icelandic Cup (1): 2009

References

External links

1986 births
Living people
Arnor Adalsteinsson
Arnor Adalsteinsson
Arnor Adalsteinsson
Arnor Adalsteinsson
Hønefoss BK players
Arnor Adalsteinsson
Norwegian First Division players
Eliteserien players
Arnor Adalsteinsson
Expatriate footballers in Norway
Arnor Adalsteinsson
Association football defenders